Aesop's Fables (later renamed Aesop's Sound Fables) is a series of animated short subjects, created by American cartoonist Paul Terry. Produced from 1921 to 1933, the series includes Closer than a Brother (1925), The Window Washers (1925), Small Town Sheriff (1927), Dinner Time (1928), and Gypped in Egypt (1930). Dinner Time is the first cartoon with a synchronized soundtrack ever released to the public. The series provided inspiration to Walt Disney to found the Laugh-O-Gram Studio in Kansas City, Missouri, where he created Mickey Mouse.

History

Terry was inspired to make the series by young actor-turned-writer Howard Estabrook, who suggested making a series of cartoons based on Aesop's Fables. Although Terry later claimed he had never heard of Aesop, he said that Estabrook's idea was worthwhile. Terry immediately began to set up a new studio called Fables Studios, Inc. and received backing from the Keith-Albee Theatre circuit.

The series launched on June 19, 1921, with The Goose That Laid the Golden Eggs. On that same day,  Van Beuren announced that the pictures would be distributed exclusively by Pathe. Only the earliest films are loose adaptations of the actual fables and later entries usually revolve around cats, mice, and the disgruntled Farmer Al Falfa. Terry had developed Farmer Al in the previous decade, and this series would be his most prolific appearance.

Each short concludes with a moral that usually has nothing to do with the actual cartoon itself. Terry staffer Mannie Davis once remarked that the morals were even "funnier than the whole picture itself" and Terry said "The fact that they're ambiguous is the thing that made 'em funny". Morals include "Go around with a chip on your shoulder and someone will knock your block off" or "Marriage is a good institution, but who wants to live in an institution?"

The series proved to be enormously popular with the public during the 1920s. Walt Disney admitted that his earliest ambition was to produce cartoons of comparable quality to Paul Terry. With the popularity of Al Jolson's part-talkie The Jazz Singer in 1927, as well as the huge success of the first all-talkie Lights of New York in 1928, producer Amadee J. Van Beuren realized the potential of sound films and bought Fables Studios to produce sound animation films. Van Beuren, now owner of the newly-named Van Beuren Studios, urged Terry to add the innovation to his films. Terry argued that adding sound would only complicate the production process, but ended up doing so anyway, and the series would now be renamed Aesop's Sound Fables.

Released in October 1928, Dinner Time is the first cartoon with a synchronized soundtrack ever released to the public. However, the film was overshadowed by the release of Disney's Steamboat Willie on November 18, 1928. Fable Studios did not cease production of silent cartoons until the release of Presto-Chango on April 14, 1929. The series also includes Closer than a Brother (1925), The Window Washers (1925), Small Town Sheriff (1927), Good Old Schooldays (1930), Gypped in Egypt (1930), Cinderella Blues (1931), The Wild Goose Chase (1932), and Silvery Moon (1933).

In 1929 Terry quit, starting his own TerryToons Studios, and John Foster took over the series under the Van Beuren Corporation, formerly Fable Studios, Inc. The series finally came to a close in 1933.  The Internet Movie Database (IMDb) lists 447 titles from 1920 to 1929 under the production company name of Aesop Fables Studio, and 279 titles under Van Beuren Studios from 1928 to 1936.

Legacy
Aesop's Fables provided inspiration to Walt Disney to found the Laugh-O-Gram Studio in Kansas City, Missouri, where he and Ub Iwerks co-created the Laugh-O-Grams and the Alice Comedies. Even into 1930, Disney wanted his cartoons to be funny as the series.

See also
 Animation in the United States during the silent era

Notes

References

Bibliography

External links
 
 

Animated film series
1921 animated films
Van Beuren Studios
Terrytoons
Film series introduced in 1921
Aesop's Fables (film series)
1921 films